Trioza is a genus of sap-sucking bugs in the family Triozidae.

Species

 Trioza acuta
 Trioza acutipennis
 Trioza adventicia
 Trioza alacris
 Trioza alseuosmiae
 Trioza apicalis
 Trioza australis
 Trioza banksiae
 Trioza barrettae Taylor & Moir, 2014
 Trioza bifida
 Trioza centranthi (Vallot 1829)
 Trioza chenopodii
 Trioza colorata
 Trioza compressa
 Trioza crinita
 Trioza crithmi
 Trioza dacrydii
 Trioza decurvata
 Trioza dentiforceps
 Trioza discariae
 Trioza doryphora
 Trioza emarginata
 Trioza equalis
 Trioza erytreae Del Guercio, 1918
 Trioza eugeniae
 Trioza falcata
 Trioza fasciata
 Trioza femoralis
 Trioza flavida
 Trioza flavipennis
 Trioza fletcheri Crawford, 1912
 Trioza galii
 Trioza gourlayi
 Trioza hebicola
 Trioza hopeae
 Trioza irregularis
 Trioza jambolanae
 Trioza kentae
 Trioza latiforceps
 Trioza machilicola
 Trioza magnoliae
 Trioza malloticola
 Trioza munda
 Trioza obfusca
 Trioza obscura
 Trioza oleariae
 Trioza pallida
 Trioza panacis
 Trioza parvipennis
 Trioza proxima
 Trioza remota
 Trioza rhamni
 Trioza schefflericola
 Trioza scobina
 Trioza styligera
 Trioza subacuta
 Trioza subvexa
 Trioza tricornuta
 Trioza tristaniae
 Trioza urticae
 Trioza velutina
 Trioza vitreoradiata

Former species
 Trioza albiventris (Förster, 1848) was transferred to Bactericera albiventris.
 Trioza tasmaniensis (Froggatt, 1903) was transferred to Schedotrioza tasmaniensis.

References

External links
 

Triozidae
Psylloidea genera
Taxa named by Arnold Förster